Christophe Malavoy (born 21 March 1952 in Reutlingen, West Germany), is a French actor.

Selected filmography

References

External links

1952 births
Living people
20th-century French male actors
French male film actors
Most Promising Actor César Award winners
People from Reutlingen